Shaban Trstena (born 1 January 1965) is a Macedonian-Albanian former freestyle wrestler.

Trstena was born in Skopje, SFR Yugoslavia and is of Albanian ethnicity. Growing up in Čair, Trstena joined the Liria Wrestling Club and was trained by notable coaches Mentaz Allajbegu and Hajrush Sinani, who had also trained notable wrestlers Shaban Sejdiu, Bajram Qorrolli, Abdulla Mehmeti, Mustaf Syla, Shend Kamberi and Adnan Elezi.

Trstena won the gold medal at the 1984 Olympics in Los Angeles and also won the silver medal at the 1988 Olympics in Seoul. Trstena is currently the youngest to win any wrestling gold at the Olympics, being 19 years of age at the Los Angeles Olympics.

He would win in his wrestling carrier the 1984 European Championship and the 1990 European Wrestling Championship in Poznan. Trstena also won gold beating the then World Champion Valentin Yordanov. Trstena would then win silver in 1983, 1985, 1986, and the bronze in 1982 and 1988.

In the 1982 World Wrestling Championships, Trstena reached bronze. During the three times he competed in the Mediterranean or Balkan Games, he won gold in all three. He has been pronounced the Best Macedonian athlete many times and once, in 1984 the best athlete of Yugoslavia. In 2000 he has been also pronounced the best Albanian athlete of the last century. He has won 715 matches out of 741 fights. He participated in 42 tournaments in the world winning 30 gold medals, the remainder being silver and bronze. At the Atlanta Olympic Games in 1996 he won the fifth place.

References

1965 births
Living people
Albanians in North Macedonia
Sportspeople from Skopje
Macedonian male sport wrestlers
Olympic wrestlers of Yugoslavia
Olympic wrestlers of North Macedonia
Wrestlers at the 1984 Summer Olympics
Wrestlers at the 1988 Summer Olympics
Wrestlers at the 1996 Summer Olympics
Yugoslav male sport wrestlers
Olympic gold medalists for Yugoslavia
Olympic silver medalists for Yugoslavia
Olympic medalists in wrestling
European champions for Yugoslavia
World Wrestling Championships medalists
Medalists at the 1988 Summer Olympics
Medalists at the 1984 Summer Olympics
Mediterranean Games gold medalists for Yugoslavia
Competitors at the 1983 Mediterranean Games
Competitors at the 1987 Mediterranean Games
Competitors at the 1991 Mediterranean Games
Mediterranean Games medalists in wrestling
European Wrestling Championships medalists